Edward Barnett (19 November 1818 – 1899) was an English cricketer. Barnett's batting and bowling styles are unknown.

Barnett made his first-class debut for The Bs against the Marylebone Cricket Club at Lord's in 1837. In 1841, he made his first-class debut for Sussex against the Marylebone Cricket Club at Lord's. He made two further first-class appearances for the county in that season, against Kent at the Old County Ground, West Malling, and a return fixture against the Marylebone Cricket Club at the Royal New Ground, Brighton. In that same season he also made a single first-class appearance for the Slow Bowlers against the Fast Bowlers at Lord's, indicating that although his exact bowling style is unknown, he was likely a slow bowler. It is however possible that he was a given man. In total, he made five first-class appearances, scoring 42 runs at an average of 4.20, with a high score of 9.

He died at Blean, Kent, sometime in 1899.

References

External links

1818 births
1899 deaths
English cricketers
The Bs cricketers
Sussex cricketers
Fast v Slow cricketers
People from Blean